The following is a list of the 431 communes of the Aube department of France.

The communes cooperate in the following intercommunalities (as of 2020):
Communauté d'agglomération Troyes Champagne Métropole
Communauté de communes d'Arcis, Mailly, Ramerupt
Communauté de communes du Barséquanais en Champagne
Communauté de communes du Chaourçois et du Val d'Armance
Communauté de communes Forêts, Lacs, Terres en Champagne
Communauté de communes des Lacs de Champagne
Communauté de communes du Nogentais
Communauté de communes de l'Orvin et de l'Ardusson
Communauté de communes du Pays d'Othe
Communauté de communes des Portes de Romilly-sur-Seine
Communauté de communes de la Région de Bar-sur-Aube
Communauté de communes Seine et Aube
Communauté de communes de Vendeuvre-Soulaines

References

Aube